Perfect Game is a 2000 American made-for-television comedy film about an eleven-year-old boy who loves baseball and yearns to play on his local Little League team. It was produced for the Disney Channel, where it was first aired.

Plot
Kanin Crosby, an 11-year-old boy who longs to play baseball for his local Little League team, is surprised when he and a group of other boys who, like him, are not all that talented, make the team. The team is led by experienced coach Bobby Geiser. The team soon find out, however, that Geiser was obliged to take the less-than-stellar players on in order to win a bet, provoking anger in Kanin, his friends and his mother Diane.

With Diane's help, the team overthrow Geiser and he is replaced by Billy, a retired school baseball coach. The team soon find out, however, that their new coach requires just as much self-assurance as they do. Through this they discover the value of teamwork.

Cast
 Edward Asner as Coach Billy
 Patrick Duffy as Coach Bobby Geiser
 Cameron Finley as Kanin 'Canine' Crosby
 Tracy Nelson as Diane Crosby
 Drake Bell as Bobby Jr.
 Orlando Brown as Marcel Williams
 Paul Robert Langdon as Enrique
 Shelley Malil as Coach Ravi
 Christopher Naoki Lee as Satoshi Miyati
 Bryan Matsuura as Osamu Miyati
 Hayley Palmer as Kelly
 Chelsea Parnell as Logan Crosby
 Sara Paxton as Sydney
 Martin Spanjers as Brian
 Jacqueline Steiger as Marsha
 Zachary Britton as a ballplayer

External links
 

2000 films
2000 television films
2000s sports comedy-drama films
American baseball films
American sports comedy-drama films
2000 comedy films
2000 drama films
American drama television films
2000s English-language films
2000s American films